Franopol may refer to:

 Franopol, Łódź Voivodeship
 Franopol, Masovian Voivodeship